Kenneth Eliot Flach (May 24, 1963 – March 12, 2018) was an American doubles world No. 1 tennis player. He won four Grand Slam men's doubles titles (two Wimbledon and two US Open), and two mixed doubles titles (Wimbledon and the French Open). He also won the men's doubles gold medal at the 1988 Seoul Olympics, partnering Robert Seguso. Flach reached the world No. 1 doubles ranking in 1985.

Early life
Kenneth Eliot Flach was born on May 24, 1963, in St. Louis and grew up in nearby Kirkwood, Missouri.

Before turning professional, Flach played tennis for Southern Illinois University-Edwardsville, where he won the NCAA Division II singles championships in 1981, 1982 and 1983, and teamed with Seguso to reach the 1983 Division I doubles final.

Flach married his first wife, model Sandra Freeman, in September 1986 and had four children together, Dylan, Madison, Noah and Hannah.

Career
Flach played doubles on the US Davis Cup team from 1985 to 1991, compiling an 11–2 record. He was also a member of the US team which won the World Team Cup in 1985.

During his career, Flach won 36 doubles titles (34 men's doubles and 2 mixed doubles). His final career title was won in 1994 at Scottsdale, Arizona. At the US Open 1987 (second round) he won the longest fifth set tie-break to this day, 17-15 over Darren Cahill.

Following his retirement from the professional tour in 1996, Flach devoted himself to coaching. He guided Vanderbilt University to its first NCAA tournament berth in 1999. In 2003, he led the team to Vanderbilt's first NCAA championship finals appearance in any sport. He had also played in seniors events, and won the Wimbledon 35-and-over men's doubles title in 1999 and 2000.

In 2010, after moving to California, he married makeup entrepreneur Christina Friedman, and became the director of tennis at Novato's Rolling Hills Club.

Death
In early March 2018, Flach became ill with bronchitis after playing 36 holes of golf. He passed away shortly after falling ill with his sister, brothers and four children by his side.

Major finals

Grand Slam finals

Doubles: 6 (4 titles, 2 runner-ups)

Mixed doubles: 2 (2 titles)

Olympic men's doubles final

Career finals

Doubles (34 wins, 24 losses)

Doubles performance timeline

Notes

References

External links
 
 
 
 
 

1963 births
2018 deaths
American male tennis players
American tennis coaches
French Open champions
Olympic gold medalists for the United States in tennis
SIU Edwardsville Cougars men's tennis players
Tennis players from St. Louis
Tennis players at the 1988 Summer Olympics
US Open (tennis) champions
Wimbledon champions
Grand Slam (tennis) champions in mixed doubles
Grand Slam (tennis) champions in men's doubles
People from Alpharetta, Georgia
Medalists at the 1988 Summer Olympics
Tennis people from Georgia (U.S. state)
Sportspeople from Fulton County, Georgia
Vanderbilt Commodores men's tennis coaches
ATP number 1 ranked doubles tennis players